The 2019 Formula 4 United States Championship season was the fourth season of the United States Formula 4 Championship, a motor racing series regulated according to FIA Formula 4 regulations and sanctioned by SCCA Pro Racing, the professional racing division of the Sports Car Club of America.

Teams and drivers 
All teams were American-registered.

Race calendar
All races will be held on permanent road courses in the United States. The series schedule was announced on 7 December 2018.

Championship standings

Points were awarded as follows:

Drivers' standings

Teams' standings

Notes

References

External links 
 

United States
United States F4 Championship seasons
F4 United States Championship
United States F4